Cumiskey is a surname. Notable people with the surname include:

Frank Cumiskey (1912–2004), American gymnast
Kyle Cumiskey (born 1986), Canadian ice hockey player